Phragmaspidium is a genus of fungi in the Microthyriaceae family.

Species
As accepted by Species Fungorum;
 Phragmaspidium corruscans 
 Phragmaspidium manaosense 
 Phragmaspidium viniferae

References

External links
Index Fungorum

Microthyriales